, known by the stage name  is a Japanese comedian, lyricist, actor, novelist, and film director.

He is mainly known his improvisational ability and for his style of physical comedy.

Gekidan is represented with Ohta Production. His wife is tarento Akane Osawa.

Early life and career

Kawashima's parents were employed by Japan Airlines (his father was a pilot; his mother was a flight attendant). Due to the nature of their occupation, Kawashima lived in Anchorage, Alaska, for three years as a child, from second to fifth grade.

In 1992, while in his first year of high school, Kawashima appeared on the variety program Tensai Takeshi no Genki ga Deru Terebi!! and garnered the attention of Ohta Production to sign him as a comedy talent. He began activities in a kombi called "Suplex", but were relatively unsuccessful. Kawashima transferred and dropped out of high schools multiple times before graduating from Chiba Ritsufunabashi High School at the age of 20. He then went on to enroll in Tōhō Gakuen in Tokyo and specialized in broadcasting arts, graduating in 1999.

Kawashima's unit, "Suplex", disbanded in 2000 and Kawashima continued activities as a solo comedian with the name "Gekidan Hitori", which translates to "one-person troupe". After going solo, Gekidan became vastly more popular and successful in the industry, with numerous appearances in various television and variety programs. He continued to flourish in the following years, even becoming active as an actor in TV dramas and movies.

Character

Name

When "Suplex" disbanded, Kawashima needed a new name to continue activities as a solo comedian. Both were rejected by Kawashima's manager, stating that he "sees no future" for these names in the industry to succeed. During a chat with fellow comedian and script writer Kazuhiro Yasuda, when Kawashima asked Yasuda who is his favorite actor, Yasuda responded with Robert De Niro, but with bad pronunciation, which to Kawashima sounded like "Rohata de Nirō", which literally translates to "Niro from the Furnace", and sparked him to suggest the use of the name. This was, however, also rejected by his manager. Kawashima chose the name "Gekidan Hitori" in the end.

Gekidan Hitori is commonly referred to as Hitori or Kawashima by most others in the industry. Tamori, on the other hand, calls him Gekidan. His wife Akane Ozawa refers to him as "Shingo-tan".

Interests and Hobbies

 He is proficient with Rubik's Cubes, as he is able to solve a standard 3×3 cube in 42 seconds. On July 30, 2006, Kawashima entered the 2006 Tokyo Rubik's Cube Grand Prix and placed 68th out of 133 contestants.

 His favorite food is pizza. When asked what he last late on a TV program appearance, Kawashima said Domino's Pizza. Afterwards, he appeared as the face of a series of Domino's commercials in 2007 with their invitation.

 He is good friends with Going Under Ground, a Japanese alternative rock band. He also appeared in their music video for the single "Issho ni Kaerō" (いっしょに帰ろう) in 2009.

 He has publicly stated that he is a big fan of Christel Takigawa.

 As a student, Kawashima was a fan of Downtown, and purposefully imitated Hitoshi Matsumoto's hairstyle.

Bibliography

Filmography

Variety

Current appearances

Semi-regular (irregular appearances)

Specials, one-offs

Former, semi-regular

Other appearances

TV dramas

Anime television

Films
Director

Writer

Actor

Animated films

Radio programmes
 Current

 Former

Advertisements

Serials

Video games

Stage

DVD

Music videos

References

External links

  
  

Japanese comedians
Japanese television personalities
Japanese male film actors
Japanese male television actors
Japanese male voice actors
Japanese film directors
Japanese novelists
Japanese lyricists
Japanese competitive eaters
Voice actors from Chiba (city)
Male voice actors from Chiba Prefecture
1977 births
Living people